Mats Gerdau (born 1964), is a Swedish politician of the Moderate Party. He was a member of the Riksdag from 2006 to 2012 and has been Mayor of Nacka Municipality since then.

References

Riksdagen: Mats Gerdau (m)

Members of the Riksdag from the Moderate Party
Living people
1964 births
Date of birth missing (living people)